Les Ablettes was a 20th-century French punk-rock band from Fumel (Lot-et-Garonne, Nouvelle-Aquitaine). They charted in 1987 in France when the single "Jackie s'en fout" reached No. 46.

References

French punk rock groups
Year of establishment missing
Musical groups from Nouvelle-Aquitaine